Matt Shapira is an American artist, director and producer. He is best known for directing the comedy feature film Swing of things, and for his Roaming Elephant art works.

Life and career
Shapira was born in Los Angeles, California. He spent eleven years as a talent agent along with his father David Shapira. In 2017, his feature film Big Muddy starring Brian Thompson, Brian Thomas Smith and Kassandra Clementi, premiered at St. Louis International Film Festival and won best film at the Niagara Falls International Film Festival. He has chosen to focus his attention and painting on Indian and African Elephants, his work can be seen all over the world, on canvas, murals, clothing apparel and more. He worked with NGO's across the globe to raise awareness and funds for conservation of elephants. His recent feature film work on the Lionsgate released comedy The Swing of Things, starring Adelaide Kane, Luke Wilson and Carolyn Hennesy.

Filmography

As cinematographer

Sunflower (2019)
Behind the Walls (2018)
Big Muddy (2017)
The Dark Tapes (2016)
Drowners (2016)
Apple in the Rain (2012)
Week in Beauty (2012)
A Needle's Point (2011)
Beneath the Wheel (2011)
Mere Image (2010)

References

External links 

 Roaming Elephant Productions

1977 births
Living people
American male painters
21st-century American painters
American film directors